Scissurella redferni is a species of minute sea snail, a marine gastropod mollusk or micromollusk in the family Scissurellidae, the little slit snails.

Description
The shell grows to  a height of 0.7 mm.

Distribution
This species occurs in the Atlantic Ocean off the Bahamas and in the Caribbean Sea off Cuba.

References

External links
 To Encyclopedia of Life
 To World Register of Marine Species

Scissurellidae
Gastropods described in 1996